Cosimo is the Italian form of the Greek name  Kosmas (latinised as Cosmas).

Cosimo may refer to:

Characters
 Cosimo Piovasco di Rondò, hero of Italo Calvino's 1957 novel The Baron in the Trees

Given name

Medici family
 Cosimo di Giovanni de' Medici (disambiguation), any of several people of the same name, including:
 Cosimo de' Medici (1389–1464), ruler of Florence, Italy
 Cosimo I de' Medici, Grand Duke of Tuscany (1519–1574)
 Cosimo II de' Medici, Grand Duke of Tuscany (1590–1621)
 Cosimo III de' Medici, Grand Duke of Tuscany (1642–1723)

Other people
 Cosimo Antonelli (1925–2014), Italian water polo player
 Cosimo Bartoli (1503–1572), Italian diplomat and humanist
 Cosimo Boscaglia (c.1550–1621), Italian professor of philosophy
 Cosimo Caliandro (1982–2011), Italian middle distance runner
 Cosimo Cavallaro (born 1961), Italian-Canadian artist
 Cosimo Commisso (soccer), Canadian soccer player
 Cosimo Daddi (died 1630), Italian painter
 Cosimo Fancelli (c. 1620–1688), Italian sculptor
 Cosimo Fanzago (1591–1678), Italian architect and sculptor 
 Cosimo Lotti (1571–1643), Italian engineer
 Cosimo Matassa (1926–2014), Italian-American studio owner
 Cosimo Morelli (1732–1812), Italian architect
 Cosimo Perrotta (born 1942), Italian professor of economic history
 Cosimo Pinto (born 1943), Italian boxer
 Cosimo Rosselli (1439–1507), Italian painter
 Cosimo Tura (c. 1430–1495), Italian painter
 Cosimo Ulivelli (1625–1704), Italian painter

Surname
 Piero di Cosimo (1462–1522), Italian painter

See also 
 Cosimo Commisso (disambiguation)
 Cosma (disambiguation)
 Cosmas (disambiguation)
 Cosmo (disambiguation)
 Cosmo (name)
 Kosmo, a geographic information software
 Kosmo!, a Malaysian newspaper